

Red Bike is a public bicycle sharing system using B-cycle that serves parts of Cincinnati and Northern Kentucky with 64 bike stations. The system opened to the public in September 2014 with 35 stations and 260 bikes, and operates with 600 bikes out of 64 stations as of February 2023.

History
With a recommendation from the Cincinnati Bike Share Feasibility Study completed in September 2012, Cincinnati installed Phase 1 of the Red Bike system in the downtown, OTR and Uptown neighborhoods which opened to the public in September 2014.
 An expansion of the system was completed in the summer of 2015 which increased the size from 35 stations to 50 stations. The expansion added 11 new stations to Northern Kentucky, making it the first bike share system in Kentucky, and added 4 stations in other areas of Cincinnati. During July 2016 six new stations were added to the system.

The initial cost of setting up Cincy Red Bike was approximately US$2 million. The city of Cincinnati provided $1.1 million with the rest of the capital coming from private funding.

As of July, 2022, Red Bike had grown to 59 bike share stations and more than 500 publicly-shared bicycles. 

The system had its 100,000th ride early October, 2015 (a year and a few weeks after the system opened).

The bikes
The bicycles are utility bicycles with a unisex step-through frame. Their one-piece aluminum frame and handlebars conceal cables and fasteners in an effort to protect them from vandalism and inclement weather.

Payment 

24-hour daily ($10) passes are sold through Red Bike docking stations.

The annual membership rate is $100.

Residents of Cincinnati and Northern Kentucky who receive food or energy assistance, or are clients of one of Red Bike's partner organizations, qualify for a $5 monthly pass called Red Bike Go.

Trips using these passes are limited to 2 hours for daily and annual passes, before extra fees kick in.

All payments are by credit card, with the exception of Red Bike Go monthly passes which may be purchased with cash in person at outreach events or by appointment at the Red Bike Shop.

See also 
List of bicycle sharing systems

References 

Community bicycle programs
Cycling in Cincinnati
Bicycle sharing in the United States